Tony Joe White was an American singer-songwriter. His discography comprises 16 studio albums, four live albums, two greatest hits albums and 29 singles.

Albums

US singles

CD singles

References

Discographies of American artists
Rock music discographies